Hot August Night/NYC is a DVD release from Neil Diamond released on August 14, 2009. The DVD features songs from Diamond's four shows at Madison Square Garden during his 2008 tour. An accompanying 2-CD album was released at the same time.

An edited, hour-long special featuring songs from this DVD was shown on CBS on the night of the disc's release. The special was watched by 13 million viewers.

This is the third in a series of similarly titled live albums; it was preceded by Hot August Night (1972) and Hot August Night II (1987).

Track listing
"Holly Holy"
"Street Life"
"Beautiful Noise"
"Love on the Rocks"
"Play Me"
"Cherry, Cherry"
"Thank the Lord for the Night Time"
"Home Before Dark"
"Don't Go There"
"Pretty Amazing Grace"
"Crunchy Granola Suite"
"Done Too Soon"
"Brooklyn Roads"
"I Am...I Said"
"Solitary Man"
"Kentucky Woman"
"Forever in Blue Jeans"
"Sweet Caroline"
"Sweet Caroline" (reprise)
"You Don't Bring Me Flowers"
"Song Sung Blue"
"I'm a Believer"
"Man of God"
"Hell Yeah"
"Cracklin' Rosie"
"America"
"Brother Love's Travelling Salvation Show"

Charts

Weekly charts

Year-end charts

DVD

Certifications and sales

References

Neil Diamond live albums
2009 live albums
2009 video albums
Live video albums
Albums recorded at Madison Square Garden
Films directed by Hamish Hamilton (director)